The Hermetic Organ Vol. 2 is an album by John Zorn, consisting of a live improvisation on the Aeolian-Skinner pipe organ of St. Paul's Chapel at Columbia University, which was recorded on September 23, 2013 and released on Tzadik Records in January 2014. The performance was part of the Miller Theatre's Zorn @ 60 series. It follows Zorn's first volume of organ improvisations, The Hermetic Organ (2012).

Reception

Brian Questa of The Free Jazz Collective  stated "In The Hermetic Organ, Vol. 2, the command he has over his own improvisations is remarkable. His instincts lead him to a sensitive balance of colors and expressions. There are no awkward transitions, no embarrassing turns of phrase, nothing to suggest that, for Zorn, the risks inherent in free improvisation produce anything other than quality music".

Track listing
All compositions by John Zorn

Office Nr 9: The Passion
 "Crucifixion" - 6:55  
 "Prayer" - 9:12  
 "Ascent Into the Maelstrom" - 4:34  
 "In Gloria Dei" - 11:28  
 "Holy Spirit" - 7:17  
 "Battle of the Angels" - 3:16  
 "Communion" - 4:21

Personnel
John Zorn − Aeolian-Skinner organ

References

John Zorn live albums
2014 live albums
Tzadik Records live albums
Albums produced by John Zorn
Sequel albums